Tharamani is an area in the south Indian city of Chennai. It is known for the presence of the city's first IT parks and numerous government educational and research institutions. It is located adjacent to the posh residential area of Adyar and Besant Nagar in South Chennai. It is an Estate with Express IT Companies, making it a massive located neighbourhood in the IT Expressway.

Location
The temple of Madhya Kailash, at the junction of the Old Mahabalipuram Road and Sardar Patel Road, marks the beginning of Tharamani. Tharamani adjoins Adyar, Besant Nagar, Thiruvanmiyur, Velachery and Perungudi. The arterial road, often described as an IT corridor, is Rajiv Gandhi Salai, formerly known as Old Mahabalipuram Road. Another important road in the area is the Tharamani Link Road which connects Tharamani with Velachery. It runs from SRP Tools Junction on Rajiv Gandhi Salai to Vijayanagar bus terminus in Velachery, where it merges with Velachery Main Road, which goes from Little Mount Junction in Saidapet to Tambaram via Medavakkam. This is being widened into a six-lane road because of the enormous increase in traffic.

Educational and research institutions
Tharamani is home to several research labs and institutions such as:
 American International School–Chennai
 Adyar Film Institute
 Asian College of Journalism
 Central Polytechnic Chennai
 Central Leather Research Institute
 Central Electronics Engineering Research Institute
 University of Madras
 Institute of Mathematical Sciences
 Indian Institute of Technology, Madras
 Institute of Textile Technology, Madras
 Institute of Printing Technology, Madras
 Institute of Chemical Technology, Madras
 Institute of Polymer Technology, Madras
 Institute of Leather Technology, Madras
 MS Swaminathan Research Foundation
 National Environmental Engineering Research Institute
 National Institute of Fashion Technology
 National Institute of Technical Teachers' Training and Research, Chennai
 Tidel Park
 Society for Applied Microwave Electronics Engineering and Research (SAMEER)—Chennai
 The School of Excellence in Law, The Tamil Nadu Dr. Ambedkar Law University, Chennai
 IIT Research Park
 TICEL biopark

Japanese School Educational Trust of Chennai (チェンナイ補習授業校 Chennai Hoshū Jugyō Kō), a weekend Japanese school, is at American International School Chennai. It moved to AIS Chennai in 2003.

Transport 

There is a bus terminus in Tharamani. There are also two MRTS in the area, Thiruvanmiyur and Taramani.

Film City 

The MGR Film City was constructed in Tharamani in 1996.  The Film City was a major project of Tamil Nadu Chief Minister J. Jayalalitha during her first term in office. Recently, there have been news reports that it is being converted into a "Knowledge Park".

Religion
There are several temple, mosque and churches in the area.

References

Neighbourhoods in Chennai
Cities and towns in Chennai district